The Catalina Island bison herd is a small group of introduced American bison living on Catalina Island off the coast of Southern California. In 1924, several bison were acquired and, before the end of 1925, brought to Catalina. The bison are now quite popular with the tourists. Some buildings have been painted with images of bison and decorated with bison weather vanes. Over the decades, the bison herd numbered as many as 600. The population currently numbers approximately 100.

History 
Registered as privately-owned agricultural livestock in a fenced-restricted area, it has been commonly reported that the bison were imported in 1924 for the silent film version of Zane Grey's Western tale, The Vanishing American. However, the 1925 version of The Vanishing American does not contain any bison and shows no terrain that resembles Catalina, according to Jim Watson, columnist for The Catalina Islander newspaper. In an October 6, 1938 article in The Catalina Islander, he attributes the bison arrival to the filming of The Thundering Herd, a silent film released in 1925. A September 1938 article in Nation's Business said the herd then numbered about 30 animals and was left behind with Wrigley's permission after a Lasky Western filmed on the island in 1925. Contemporaneous reports in the Los Angeles Times and New York Times state that The Thundering Herd used a collection of Yellowstone National Park animals herded together for the movie. Other shooting locations were the Sierra Nevada mountains and Calabasas.

AllAboutBison.com, citing newspaper sources and national herd records, argues that the bison were filmed in Yellowstone and then some surplus animals from that herd were sent to Catalina Island by Lasky executives as a bison savings account of sorts, to be used as future events warrant. Newspaper accounts datelined December 11, 1924 state that 16 bison of 86 culls from the Yellowstone herd (which had numbered 780 on August 1, 1924) had been sent to California and then were headed to Catalina.

Other animals culled that year went to cities, game preserves, forests and private estates, plus a pair to Flo Zeigfield. Except for shipping and handling in the form of freight fees, the bison were free upon request, although supplies were limited.

A 1949 report on a bison roundup on the island claimed that it was in "1924, I think" that a film company left behind 13 "bulls and stags" in Skull Canyon. In 1934, Wrigley and his ranch staff bought 17 bison ("mostly cows") from Colorado. Five were sold to a resort in Arizona, and the other 12 were sent on the Los Angeles Stockyards and then shipped to the island by steamer.

A 1961 report in Sports Illustrated stated, "Buffalo (nobody calls them bison) roam the island in two herds. The first was left there 30-odd years ago after the filming of a western. The second was introduced a few years later in hopes of supplementing the original, but the two herds refused to mingle."

Ecology and management 
The bison herd is maintained and monitored by the Catalina Island Conservancy. Controlling the bison population is important for the island's ecological health. Bison are not native to Catalina Island. Santa Catalina Island Conservancy makes sure that the number of bison on the island does not exceed the carrying capacity. In 2003, a study was conducted on the bison herd to estimate the carrying capacity of bison on several zones that the bison spend the most time in. The study developed options to prevent the bison from affecting native species such as restricting bison to one or more zones or to get rid of all the bison from the island. The study found the bison's shaggy coats carry imported plants such as fennel which disrupt endemic species like St. Catherine's lace.

The 2003 study determined that a herd of between 150 and 200 would be good for the bison, and less ecologically damaging for the island. In the past, bison were routinely removed and sent to the mainland to auction. In 2004, the Conservancy partnered with the Morongo Band of Mission Indians, the Tongva (thought to be Catalina's original inhabitants some 7,000 years ago), and the Lakota tribe on the Rosebud Reservation in South Dakota. A hundred bison were relocated to the Great Plains.

Biologists found that the bison have genes from cattle in their ancestry in 2007. They also found that they have a smaller size, different length of legs, jaw length overbite, low fertility, and behavioral problems (such as punctuated walking in tight circles).

Beginning in 2009, the herd was given animal birth control to maintain the population at around 150 animals. With the herd numbering around 100 animals in 2020 and no new bison births in several years, Catalina Island Conservancy made the decision to introduce two pregnant female bison by the end of the year. The new additions will enhance the genetics of the current bison population on the Island.

Bison-human interaction 

On August 26, 2015, a contract worker from American Conservation Experience was injured by a bison while working near Tower Peak on Catalina Island. On February 17, 2018, a man camping at the Little Harbor Campground was gored by a bison.

See also
Conservation of American bison

Notes

References

Bison herds
Santa Catalina Island (California)
Fauna of the Channel Islands of California
1924 establishments